CAR-302,196 (also known as PCMG or just by its code number 302196) is a moderately potent and relatively short lasting anticholinergic deliriant drug, related to the chemical warfare agent 3-Quinuclidinyl benzilate (QNB). It was developed under contract to Edgewood Arsenal during the 1960s as part of the US military chemical weapons program, during research to improve upon the properties of earlier agents such as QNB.

CAR-302,196 was found to be only around 1/4 the potency of QNB, but its onset of action was much faster at only a few minutes, and the duration far shorter at only 2–3 hours. A fast-acting and short-lasting anticholinergic drug was felt to be more desirable for some applications.

See also 
 CAR-302,282
 EA-3167
 N-methyl-3-piperidyl benzilate
 N-ethyl-3-piperidyl benzilate
 3-Quinuclidinyl benzilate
 Ditran

References 

Deliriants
Muscarinic antagonists
Incapacitating agents
Piperidines
Carboxylate esters
Alkyne derivatives
Tertiary alcohols
Cyclopentanes